There are seven soil deposits in India. They are alluvial soil, black soil, red soil, laterite soil,  or arid soil, and forest and mountainous soil,marsh soil. These soils are formed by the sediments brought down by the rivers. They also have varied chemical properties. Sundarbans mangrove swamps are rich in marsh soil.

Major soil deposits